Franqueville-Saint-Pierre is a commune in the Seine-Maritime department in the Normandy region in northern France.

Geography

Heraldry

Population

Places of interest
 The twentieth century Hôtel de Ville (town hall), built by Richard + Schoeller.
 The church of St.Pierre, dating from the seventeenth century.
 The church of Notre-Dame, dating from the eleventh century.
 A seventeenth-century chateau, built in brick.

See also
Communes of the Seine-Maritime department

References

External links

Official website of the commune 

Communes of Seine-Maritime